{{speciesbox
| status = VU
| status_system = IUCN3.1
| status_ref = 
| genus = Thamnophis
| species = copei
| authority = Dugès, 1879
| synonyms = *Adelophis copei 
Storeria copei 
Ischnognathus copii 
Adelophis copei 
| synonyms_ref =<ref>Boulenger GA (1893). Catalogue of the Snakes in the British Museum (Natural History). Volume I., Containing the Families ... Colubridæ Aglyphæ ... London: Trustees of the British Museum (Natural History). (Taylor and Francis, printers). xiii + 448 pp. + Plates I-XXVIII. (Ischnognathus copii, p. 289).</ref>
| range_map = Adelophis copei.png
| range_map_upright = 1.1
| range_map_caption = Geographic range of Adelophis copei| range_map_alt = Map of western central Mexico, showing a highlighted range (in red) covering four small areas in Jalisco
}}Thamnophis copei,  Cope's mountain meadow snake, is a vulnerable species of snake in the family Colubridae. The species was originally described by Alfredo Dugès in 1897, and is endemic to Mexico. It is the type species of the genus Adelophis Dugès, 1879.

The tail is about one fifth of the total length.

Habitat and geographic rangeThamnophis copei lives in the wetlands of west-central Mexico, in such areas in the Mexican states of Jalisco, Michoacán, Guanajuato, Hidalgo, and northern Morelos.

Conservation statusThamnophis copei is threatened by habitat loss due to agriculture and human settlement.  Mexico has placed national laws protecting the species, and the species is being researched for more ways to protect it.  It is protected in the Sierra Los Huicholes reserve.

References

Further reading
Dugès A (1879). 'In: Cope ED (1879). "Eleventh Contribution to the Herpetology of Tropical America". Proceedings of the American Philosophical Society 18': 261-277. (Adelophis copei'', new species, pp. 265–266).

Thamnophis
Reptiles described in 1879
Snakes of North America
Endemic reptiles of Mexico
Taxa named by Alfredo Dugès